The PocketWizard is a wireless radio triggering system for off-camera lighting developed in the late 1990s, by LPA Design, an American company based in South Burlington, Vermont.

It requires a transmitter electrically connected to the camera, usually mounted on the camera's hot shoe, to trigger a remote receiver connected to a remote flash unit via a PC Cord.

See also
Guide number
Flash synchronization
Ring flash
Flash comparison

External links

Photographic lighting